Crystal R. Hudson (born April 14, 1983) is an American politician from New York City. A Democrat, she represents the 35th district of the New York City Council, which covers parts of central Brooklyn.

Early life and education
Born and raised in Prospect Heights, Brooklyn, Hudson graduated from Spelman College with a degree in economics and later received a Master's degree in Tourism Administration from George Washington University.

Career
Hudson began her career working for the Washington Mystics, a WNBA team based in Washington, D.C. In 2011, she joined Amtrak as a marketing executive.

After moving back to New York City to care for her mother, Carole Kay, Hudson switched to public policy work, joining Brooklyn Community Board 8 and later working for Councilwoman Laurie Cumbo as her chief of operations. Hudson was chosen in 2019 to be a Deputy Public Advocate under Public Advocate Jumaane Williams, a position she held until the beginning of her campaign for New York City Council.

2021 City Council campaign
In 2020, Hudson announced her 2021 campaign to succeed the term-limited Cumbo in the City Council's 35th district. She was quickly regarded as a frontrunner in the race, raising the most money of any candidate in the field and receiving influential endorsements from Congressmembers Hakeem Jeffries and Yvette Clarke, neighboring Councilman Brad Lander, and most of the city's major unions.

Hudson's main competition came from tenant organizer Michael Hollingsworth, who was backed by the New York City Democratic Socialists of America and politicians from the city's leftmost flank. The race was characterized by Gotham Gazette as "split[ting] the city's left," as Hudson similarly claimed "progressive" policy positions and endorsements, but was put on the defensive about her establishment ties and work for the controversial Cumbo. Hudson worked to distance herself from Cumbo during the campaign, writing an op-ed for Bklyner.com calling one of Cumbo's key policy achievements a "disgrace."

On election night on June 22, Hudson led Hollingsworth 38–34% in first-place votes, with minor candidates taking the remainder; when absentee ballots and ranked-choice votes were counted, Hudson expanded her lead to 54–46%. She declared victory, and Hollingsworth conceded defeat, on July 6. Hudson faced minimal opposition in the November general election, and won.

Personal life
Hudson is openly gay, and lives in Prospect Heights with her partner, political strategist Sasha Neha Ahuja. Hudson served as the primary caregiver for her mother, who suffered from Alzheimer's disease, until she died in April 2021.

References

Living people
People from Prospect Heights, Brooklyn
Politicians from Brooklyn
Spelman College alumni
George Washington University alumni
Lesbian politicians
LGBT people from New York (state)
LGBT African Americans
New York (state) Democrats
21st-century American women politicians
1983 births
21st-century American politicians
American LGBT city council members
Women New York City Council members
New York City Council members
African-American New York City Council members